The Badoer were an aristocratic family in the Republic of Venice. The Badoer traced their ancestry, without any factual basis, to Doge Giustiniano Participazio in the early 9th century. In fact, they rose to prominence in the 13th century.

Notable members

Stefano Badoer (fl. 1227–1242)
Marco Badoer (d. 1288)
Badoero Badoer (d. 1310), podestà of Padua implicated in the 
Marino Badoer (d. 1324)
Marino Badoer, duke of Crete in 1313–1315, dedicatee of Paolino Veneto's mirror for princes
 (fl. 1280–1333), wife of Marco Polo
Pietro Badoer (d. 1371)
 (1332–1389), theologian and cardinal
Albano Badoer (d. 1428)
Giacomo Badoer (b. 1403), author of the Libro dei conti
Iacopino Badoer (d. 1451)
Sebastiano Badoer (d. 1498)
Andrea Badoer (1447–1525), ambassador to Henry VIII of England
Giacomo Badoer (d. 1537)
Giovanni Badoer (1465–1535), politician, diplomat and poet
Alvise Badoer (d. 1554), provveditore generale of Dalmatia and ambassador to Emperor Charles V
Francesco Badoer (1507–1564)
Francesco Badoer (1512–1572), built the Villa Badoer
Andrea Biagio Badoer (1515–1575)
Federico Badoer (1519–1593), writer, diplomat and politician
Alberto Badoer (1540–1592)
Angelo Badoer (1565–1630), politician, diplomat and spy in the service of the Papal State and Spanish Empire
Francesco Badoer (1570–1610)
Giacomo Badoer (c.1575–c.1620), French diplomat and pupil of Galileo Galilei
Marino Badoer (d. 1648), bishop of Pula
Iacopo Badoer (1602–1654), politician and writer
Barbaro Giacomo Badoer (1617–1657)
Alberto Badoer (d. 1677), bishop of Crema
Giovanni Alberto Badoer (1649–1714), cardinal and patriarch of Venice

Notes

Bibliography